Girls on Probation is a 1938 American crime film directed by William C. McGann and written by Crane Wilbur. The film stars Jane Bryan, Ronald Reagan, Anthony Averill, Sheila Bromley, Henry O'Neill and Elisabeth Risdon. The film was released by Warner Bros. on August 22, 1938.

Plot
Innocent young Connie Heath (Jane Bryan) is persuaded to borrow a party dress from her friend, "fast girl" Hilda Engstrom (Sheila Bromley), who has actually misappropriated it from the dry cleaner where she works. After the real owner of the dress, witchy Gloria Adams (Susan Hayward), spots Connie out in the dress (which is subsequently torn in a car door), Connie is falsely accused of theft and prosecuted as Hilda flees town and leaves her to take the blame. Though Gloria withdraws her charge, the insurance company continues to persecute poor Connie, resulting in a charge of grand larceny. Championing her cause is crusading attorney Neil Dillon (Ronald Reagan)- coincidentally, also Connie's date on the evening in question- who gets Connie off with probation.

Connie leaves town after being mistreated by her unsympathetic father (Sig Ruman) and gets a job in order to pay for the damaged dress.  One day she spots Hilda waiting in a parked car on the street and begins to argue with her in the car when Hilda's boyfriend emerges from a bank he has just robbed, fleeing the scene with Connie in tow. She is arrested and convicted while refusing to give her real name or full story for fear of humiliating her family.

Eventually the truth begins to emerge, and Connie is given probation, returns home, and becomes engaged to Dillon. When Hilda is given probation, she returns to town as well, to make even more trouble for Connie, especially after her boyfriend escapes prison.

Cast

 Jane Bryan as Connie Heath
 Ronald Reagan as Neil Dillon
 Anthony Averill as Tony Rand
 Sheila Bromley as Hilda Engstrom
 Henry O'Neill as Judge
 Elisabeth Risdon as Kate Heath
 Sig Ruman as Roger Heath 
 Dorothy Peterson as Jane Lennox
 Susan Hayward as Gloria Adams
 Larry Williams as Terry Mason, Hilda's Date
 Arthur Hoyt as Mr. Engstrom
 Emory Parnell as Officer Craig
 Peggy Shannon, uncredited inmate

See also
 Ronald Reagan filmography

References

External links
 
 
 
 

1938 films
1938 crime films
American crime films
American black-and-white films
Films directed by William C. McGann
Warner Bros. films
1930s English-language films
1930s American films